Christopher Sheffield (born July 13, 1988) is an American actor. He is best known for playing the role of Ben in The Maze Runner and Will Mason in The Last Ship.

Filmography

Films

Television

References

External links

Living people
American male film actors
American people of Italian descent
American male television actors
People from Arlington, Texas
Male actors from Texas
1988 births